Whiskey Dick Mountain is located  east of Ellensburg, in Washington state. Within the  Whiskey Dick Unit of the L.T. Murray Wildlife Area, it is the highest point on Windy Ridge. The site of the Wild Horse Wind and Solar Facility is on its southwest flank. The farm, with 149 wind turbines, is owned by Puget Sound Energy.

Access to land owned or leased by the power company is open to the public for recreational use by permit only. The area provides opportunities for hiking and hunting.

See also
 Wild Horse Wind Farm

References

Mountains of Kittitas County, Washington
Mountains of Washington (state)